Pieter-Jan Belder (born 19 January 1966) is a Dutch instrumentalist in historically informed performance, playing recorder, harpsichord and fortepiano. He founded the ensemble Musica Amphion for recordings and performances.

Career 
Born in Capelle aan den IJssel, Belder studied recorder with Ricardo Kanjii at the Koninklijk Conservatorium in The Hague, and harpsichord with Bob van Asperen at the Sweelinck Conservatorium in Amsterdam. He graduated in 1990 in both fields.

Belder won the NDR-Musikpreis in Hamburg in 1997, and in 2000 the International Bach Competition in Leipzig. He has worked as a continuo player with ensembles such as the Nederlandse Bachvereniging, Collegium Vocale Gent, the Concertgebouworkest and Camerata Trajectina.

Belder took part in the recordings of the complete works by Johann Sebastian Bach by the label Brilliant Classics, including Das wohltemperierte Klavier. He recorded for the label also all 555 keyboard sonatas by Domenico Scarlatti in 2007, and keyboard compositions by Antonio Soler and Jean-Philippe Rameau. He has worked from 2010 to 2013 recording the complete Fitzwilliam Virginal Book of more than 300 pieces. Belder used different instruments for the different character of compositions by William Byrd, Peter Philips, Jan Pieterszoon Sweelinck, Giles Farnaby and John Bull, among others.

Musica Amphion 
Belder founded an ensemble, Musica Amphion, for playing mostly Baroque music. They recorded the complete works by Arcangelo Corelli, and the complete Tafelmusik by Georg Philipp Telemann in 2004. They then began a project with the label Etcetera Bach in Context, combining Bach's vocal works and organ compositions focused on a theme. The fifth recording, with organist and the Gesualdo Consort, combines the Organ Sonata in E-flat major, BWV 525, the funeral cantata Actus Tragicus, BWV 106, the motet , the chorale prelude on "", BWV 654, and the cantate .

The ensemble recorded in 2006 Bach's Brandenburg Concertos and his concertos for 2, 3 and 4 harpsichords. They began a recording of the complete chamber music by Henry Purcell.

References

External links 
 Pieter-Jan Belder
 Musica Amphion
 
 
 Pieter-Jan Belder ArkivMusic
 Pieter-Jan Belder
 Pieter-Jan Belder / Born 19 January 1966 BBC
 Pieter-Jan Belder (Harpsichord, Organ, Conductor) Bach Cantatas Website

1966 births
Living people
Dutch conductors (music)
Male conductors (music)
Dutch harpsichordists
Dutch recorder players
People from Capelle aan den IJssel
Royal Conservatory of The Hague alumni
Conservatorium van Amsterdam alumni
21st-century conductors (music)
21st-century male musicians
21st-century flautists